Matthew Kelly (born 7 December 1994) is an Australian cricketer. He made his List A debut for Western Australia on 7 October 2017 in the 2017–18 JLT One-Day Cup. 

In 2013 he played for the Australia Under-19 team against India, New Zealand, Zimbabwe and South Africa.  He was awarded a rookie contract with the Western Australia cricket team in April 2016. He made his first-class debut for Western Australia in the 2017–18 Sheffield Shield season on 26 October 2017.

Kelly was selected as a replacement player for the Perth Scorchers in January 2018 when Andrew Tye was picked in the Australian national team.  He made his Twenty20 debut in the Scorchers 3 run loss to Sydney Thunder, taking a wicket and a catch during the match. In April 2019, he was signed by the Indian Premier League (IPL) franchise the Kolkata Knight Riders. He replaced South African bowler Anrich Nortje, who was ruled out of the tournament by a shoulder injury. He was released by the Kolkata Knight Riders ahead of the 2020 IPL auction.

References

External links
 

1994 births
Living people
Australian cricketers
Western Australia cricketers
Perth Scorchers cricketers
Northamptonshire cricketers